Neofusicoccum pennatisporum is an endophytic fungus that might be a canker pathogen, specifically for Eucalyptus gomphocephala. It was isolated from said trees in Western Australia.

References

Further reading

Sakalidis, Monique. Investigation and analysis of taxonomic irregularities with the Botryosphaeriaceae. Diss. Murdoch University, 2011.

External links 
MycoBank

Botryosphaeriaceae
Fungi described in 2009